Between 2005 and 2007, many court cases implicated personalities of the municipal government in the city of Charleroi in Belgium. The impact and impact are significant at local, regional and even national level. Elio Di Rupo, president of the Socialist Party even attributed the defeat of his party in the 2007 Belgian federal election to the scandal.

On 16 August 2007, 33 people were charged in different cases by the investigating judge of Charleroi.

On 29 June 2012, the following convictions were pronounced. The affair ended in March 2016 with acquittals or mere convictions of those involved.

References

See also 

 List of Belgian political scandals

2000s in Belgium
Political scandals in Belgium
Charleroi
History of Charleroi